Vietnam Airlines Flight 831, a Tupolev Tu-134, crashed in a rice field near Semafahkarm Village, Tambon Khu Khot, Amphoe Lam Luk Ka, Pathum Thani, Thailand while operating a flight from Hanoi to Bangkok in 9 September 1988. The cause of the accident is undetermined, however the pilots reported the aircraft may have been struck by lightning. Three crew and 73 passengers died in the accident. This accident was the second deadliest accident at the time in Thailand, and is currently the fifth deadliest.

Accident 
While still flying above the outer marker, the aircraft descended below the minimum safe altitude and crashed into the ground.

Notable Passenger 
Among the dead was Vietnamese Minister of Public Health Đặng Hồi Xuân.

References 

1988 in Thailand
1988 in Vietnam
Accidents and incidents involving the Tupolev Tu-134
Aviation accidents and incidents in 1988
Aviation accidents and incidents in Thailand
Airliner accidents and incidents caused by weather
September 1988 events in Asia
Vietnam Airlines accidents and incidents